The Cuscatlán Bridge (Spanish: Puente Cuscatlán) was a suspension bridge which spanned across the Lempa River in El Salvador. The bridge connected the departments of San Vicente and Usulután from its opening on 6 June 1942 until it was destroyed in a bombing by militants of the Farabundo Martí National Liberation Front on 1 January 1984 during the Salvadoran Civil War. The bridge used to be a part of the Pan-American Highway and was one of the major infrastructure projects ordered by President Maximiliano Hernández Martínez. After the bridge was destroyed, it was rebuilt in 1998 at the cost of 9 million dollars and it remains standing today.

See also 

Cuscatlán Bridge (1998)
Maximiliano Hernández Martínez
Pan-American Highway

References 

1942 establishments in El Salvador
Transport buildings and structures in El Salvador
Bridges completed in 1942
Bridges in Central America